The 1991–92 season was the first in which teams from the former East were integrated into the unified German system, and Dynamo Dresden entered into the Bundesliga, having finished as runners-up in the NOFV-Oberliga the previous season. Dynamo battled against relegation for much of the season, but pulled clear with a good run of results towards the end of the season, and finished the season in 14th place.

Squad

Results

Bundesliga

DFB-Pokal

Transfers

External links
Season details at fussballdaten 

Dynamo Dresden seasons
Dynamo Dresden